Francisco Álvarez de Toledo (Oropesa, 10 July 1515 – Escalona, 21 April 1582), also known as The Viceroyal Solon, was an aristocrat and soldier of the Kingdom of Spain and the fifth Viceroy of Peru. Often regarded as the "best of Peru's viceroys", he is as often denounced for the negative impact his administration had on the Indigenous peoples of Peru.

Toledo brought stability to a tumultuous viceroyalty of Spain and enacted administrative reforms which changed the character of Spanish colonial rule and the relationship between the Indigenous peoples of the Andes and their Spanish overlords. With a policy called "reductions", Toledo forcibly relocated much of the Indigenous peoples of Peru and Bolivia into new settlements in order to enforce their Christianization, collect tributes and taxes, and gather Indigenous labor to work in mines and other Spanish enterprises. He has been condemned for the reductions, expanding the forced labor demanded of the Indigenous peoples under the mit'a of the Inca Empire, and executing Túpac Amaru, the last Inca chief of the Neo-Inca State in Vilcabamba.

Toledo held the position of viceroy from November 30, 1569, until 1 May 1581, a total of eleven years and five months. He has been praised as the "supreme organizer" of the immense viceroyalty, giving it a legal structure and strengthening institutions by which the Spanish colony functioned for more than two hundred years. Scholar John Hemming described Toledo as "one of the world's great colonial administrators". He also described him as "honest and honorable but cold and unfeeling...autocratic" and "with the temperament of an ascetic."

Birth and early years 

Francisco de Toledo was born on 15 July 1515 in Oropesa, Castile belonging to the noble family Álvarez de Toledo, while his mother died, which would influence his mood serious and taciturn. Her aunts Mary and Elizabeth were responsible for their upbringing. It was the fourth and last child of II Count of Oropesa, Francisco Álvarez de Toledo y Pacheco and María Figueroa y Toledo, eldest of Gómez Suárez de Figueroa, 2nd Count of Feria|Gómez Suárez de Figueroa, II Count of Feria and María Álvarez de Toledo, daughter of the I Duke of Alba de Tormes.

At the age of eight he moved to the court of King Charles I of Spain, to serve as a page to the queen consorts Leonor and Isabel. He learned Latin, history, rhetoric and theology, fencing, music, dancing and courtly manners.

Serving the Emperor Charles V 

Francisco de Toledo was fifteen years old when in 1530 King Charles I accepted him at home, accompanying that emperor until his last days in the most varied circumstances of both peace and war. This personal contact with the monarch, who adopted the prudent policy, "Machiavellianism" and the tendency to seek balances between his partners, would serve as a useful experience for further governmental work.

In 1535, when he was twenty, he was invested with the habit of a knight of the Order of Alcántara, a religious-military order, and years later was given to this corporation the task of Acebuchar in 1551.

The first military action in which intervened was the Conquest of Tunis (1535), a great triumph of the imperial troops over the Ottoman Turks who snatched the plaza in North Africa. Following the emperor on his tour of Europe, the young Álvarez de Toledo passed through Rome, where king Carlos I defied Francis I of France, which triggered another war with that country (the third of the reign of the emperor), between the years 1536–1538. Following the signing of peace, Álvarez de Toledo returned to Spain and later went to Ghent, in Flanders. Once participated in the expedition to the Ottoman Algiers in North Africa, campaign which ended in failure due to bad weather (1541).

In the following years he continued to serve the imperial arms, but also participated in the diets, boards and councils. It was a very turbulent time, as well as the onslaught of the Ottoman Turks occurred progress of Protestantism in Germany, region under imperial orbit. In all this time Álvarez de Toledo was near the emperor Charles V.

He met the Spanish negotiations with England to start a new war against France.

He dealt with the issues of Hispanic America interested about the legal status that should have the Indians. He was in Valladolid when Friar Bartolomé de las Casas appeared before a board of theologians the text of A Short Account of the Destruction of the Indies and knew of the writing of the New Laws of the Indies that caused such a stir in Peru.

He left Barcelona in 1543 with the emperor, for Italy and Germany during the fourth war against France. He participated in the battles of Gelderland and Düren.

In 1556 took place the abdication of Charles I and his consequent trip to Spain, and on November 12, on the way to Monastery of Yuste, entered the castle of Jarandilla de la Vera, which was hosted by its owner, 4th Count of Oropesa, Fernando Álvarez de Toledo y Figueroa, who was the nephew of Francis and who also received the old ex monarch. The stay lasted until February 3, 1557, when the works in Yuste were finished, final resting place of Charles I. They both served him  until his death in 1558.

The following years were spent by Álvarez de Toledo in activities related to the Order of Alcántara. Between 1558 and 1565 he remained in Rome, where he participated in the discussion and definition of the Statutes of the Order, as attorney general.

Viceroy of Peru
Toledo became the fifth viceroy of Peru (which included at the time Bolivia) in 1569. He was appointed viceroy by Philip II of Spain. Peru was the "jewel" of Spain's colonial empire. The conquest of the Inca Empire by Francisco Pizarro in 1532-1533 had given Spain enormous wealth, but Toledo inherited a chaotic situation. The problems facing Toledo included conflicts between and among the Spanish conquerors and the secular and religious authorities in Peru. Corruption by colonial officials was endemic. The Peruvian population of indigenous people, Andeans, had declined by about 75 percent (from 10 million to 2.5 million) from 1520 to 1570 due to conflicts and epidemics of European diseases. A rump state of the Inca Empire still existed outside Spanish control in Vilcabamba. Most seriously, from the viewpoint of Spain, was that the production of silver, a major contributor to Spain's finances, was declining.            

Until the arrival of Francisco de Toledo as Viceroy, Spanish rule of the Andean population had largely been indirect.  Except for Roman Catholic priests, Spaniards were forbidden from living among the Indians and the Spanish extracted tribute and labor from the Andean population through their indigenous leaders, the caciques or kurakas.  Other than the often brutal demands of the Spanish colonists for labor and tribute, the Andean Indian cultures remained in many ways little changed from the days when the Incas ruled.

Toledo conceived and implemented an ambitious program to "put down neo-Inca insurrection, strengthen colonial government and legal institutions, indoctrinate the native populace in Catholicism, and shore up faltering revenue streams" from mining.

General Inspection (Visita General)
Toledo arrived in Lima in November 1569.  In October 1570 he departed Lima and embarked on a personal inspection of Peru and Bolivia.  He took a large entourage, including all the viceregal court with him, for a journey that lasted five years from 1570 to 1575 with lengthy stops in important cities such as Cuzco, Arequipa, and Potosí. Prior to his departure, Toledo appointed at least 42 inspectors who were to visit every repartimiento (region) of the colony collecting information, conducting a census, appointing Andean officials and leaders, and making decisions about matters such as religion and tribute. Toledo instructed the inspectors to prepare the way for the creation of reductions. During his general inspection, Toledo ruled Peru from the road, making decisions on a large number of issues.

Destruction of the Neo-Inca State
When Toledo arrived in Peru in 1569, a Neo-Inca state with an emperor, Titu Cusi, still existed outside Spanish rule in the remote jungle city of Vilcabamba. Toledo initially hoped to lure Titu Cusi and other Inca nobles to Spanish authority by offering them estates and riches, but in the course of his investigations on the inspection tour, his opinion hardened.  Toledo learned that the Inca Empire, and the emperor and his remnant state was still venerated by many Andeans and the Inca religion was still widely practiced. He perceived the Neo-Inca state as a threat to Spanish rule and embarked on a campaign to discredit the legitimacy of the former Inca Empire, the Neo-Inca state, and the Inca religion. 

In May 1571, Titu Cusi died suddenly. The Incas in Vilcabamba blamed a Catholic priest for his death and killed him. Tupac Amaru became the new emperor. The Incas killed several more Spaniards and Toledo sent a military expedition of 250 Spaniards and 2,000 Andeans to Vilcabamba to destroy the Neo-Inca state. The Spanish captured Tupac Amaru and other Inca nobles and after a brief trial Tupac was beheaded in Plaza de Armas of Cuzco on 24 September 1572. Toledo then continued his campaign to wipe out the heritage of the Incas by destroying religious relics and punishing other Inca nobles. "Toledo rightly saw that the Inca myth would be an inspiration to any rebellious Indians over the coming centuries...but the mystique of the Incas was too strong to be rooted out by the determined Viceroy." The Incas had lost all power, but "the sentimental memory of the imperial past continued to flourish."

Reorganizing Peru
Toledo accomplished three major tasks in the reorganization of the Viceroyalty of Peru: (1) the mandatory resettlement of Andeans into Spanish-style villages called reductions; (2) the organization of silver and other mines to obtain greater revenue; and (3) the imposition of a country-wide system of forced labor by Andeans.

Reductions

Reductions were a feature of Spanish colonies throughout the Americans and in the Philippines. In Peru prior to Toledo's Viceroyalty, Andean Indians mostly lived in small, dispersed settlements.  The scattered settlements made it difficult for Spanish colonial authorities to impose their rule, but the Andeans' livelihood and survival was often dependent upon their exploitation of several different environments at different elevations and characteristics, the so-called vertical archipelago.  A primary motivation for Toledo's reductions "was to establish direct state control and facilitate the church's Christianization of the native population, while enhancing the collection of the tribute tax and the allocation of labor." Toledo said the reductions would protect natives from “being exploited by local landowners and miners, harassed by the colonial judicial system, and deceived by a false religion.” Spanish authorities perceived indigenous groups as volatile and prone to lawlessness and laziness if not controlled. Toledo's most important justification of the reductions was, as he told the king of Spain, that they would be located near the mines that were so important to Spanish finances. 

Toledo's plans envisioned 840 reductions with a total population of about 1.4 million Andeans, an average of about 1,600 people per reduction. Each reduction resembled a Spanish town with a main plaza and square and a regular grid of streets. Even the design of the houses in the reduction was dictated. They were, for example, to be open to the street to "minimize the danger that too much privacy would lead to idolatry, drunkenness, and illicit sexual intercourse." A priest attended to the spiritual needs of the residents. The leadership of each reduction was the responsibility of a Spanish style government, but the most important official of the reduction was a kuraka, an indigenous leader who had the responsibility of collecting tribute and laborers for mining and other enterprises. 

Toledo's reductions have been characterized as both mostly successful and as failures. Many towns in Peru and Bolivia trace their foundation to the creation of a reduction.  However, concentrating the Andean population into reductions increased the incidence of disease and the population of the old Inca Empire continued to decline for at least another 50 years after Toledo. A report to the king of Spain in the 1580s said that "many of the Indians have died in the mines, in other labors, or from the recurrent epidemics; others have fled to escape their labor and tribute obligations."

Mining
Mining, especially silver mining, was the most important economic enterprise of the Viceroyalty. A single mountain at Potosi in Bolivia produced an estimated 60% of all the silver mined in the world during the second half of the 16th century. A twenty percent tax on mining was a major source of revenue for the kingdom of Spain.

Silver was mined at Potosí by Inca methods, but the purest silver was depleted by the 1560s and production declined. However, the Patio process, a new method of purifying silver ore using mercury, was invented in Mexico. Toledo confiscated the mercury mines at Huancavelica for the Spanish crown and introduced the Patio process. He called it "the most important marriage in the world between the mountain of Huancavelica and the mountain of Potosi."  Between 1571 and 1575 production of silver quintupled. The increase in silver and mercury production resulted in a demand for thousands of laborers with much of the demand being filled by forced laborers.   Potosi became one of the largest cities of the world with a population as large as London.

Forced labor
The most important objective of Toledo's reductions was to facilitate access to Andean labor, especially for the mines whose revenues were important to the finances of the mother country of Spain.

Other measures
He worked hard to convert the Indigenous and provide them with religious training. He tried to adapt the political and social structures of the Incas to life in the viceroyalty. He also used the old system of mita, which had been a form of corvée labour under the Incas, as a form of forced native labor. Under his reforms of the mita, no more than one seventh of the male population of a village could be conscripted, they could not be forced to work far from their native villages, and they were entitled to compensation for their labor. These reforms later were called the Toledo Reforms.

Toledo assigned Pedro Sarmiento de Gamboa the task of writing a chronicle of prehispanic times in Peru by compiling information given by some of the older survivors from that time. Sarmiento's work is considered an invaluable source of information for that period. Toledo sent the account to the King, in hopes that a museum would be founded.

He established the Inquisition in Peru in 1570. Jerónimo Luis de Cabrera founded the city of Córdoba (in modern-day Argentina) on July 6, 1573. Tarija and Cochabamba (both in modern Bolivia) were founded in 1574.

In 1574, Toledo accompanied a military expedition to the Chaco region in what is now southeastern Bolivia to repress the Eastern Bolivian Guaraní people who the Inca and Spanish called Chiriguanos (a pejorative name). The Guaraní were raiding Spanish and Indian settlements in the Andes. The expedition was a failure and Toledo nearly died of an illness, probably malaria. 

In 1579 Francis Drake was ravaging the coast of Peru. Toledo sent a fleet of ships after the Englishman but failed to capture Drake and his galleon the Golden Hind who then went on to capture the treasure galleon Nuestra Señora de la Concepción. Afterwards Toledo subsequently built fortifications on the coast for protection against pirates and also established la Armada del Mar del Sur (the Southern Fleet) under Pedro Sarmiento de Gamboa in the port of El Callao.

He built bridges and improved the safety of travel in the viceroyalty. The first coins minted for Peru (and indeed for South America) appeared between 1568 and 1570. The silver from mines at Potosí circulated around the world.

Recall, return to Spain, imprisonment and death
In spite of this, Toledo was blamed for the viceregal books not being balanced and taxes not being sent back to Spain. He was recalled to Spain in 1581. There he was jailed until 1582, where he died of natural causes.

See also
Neo-Inca State
Spanish conquest of the Inca Empire

Further reading
Levillier, Roberto. Don Francisco de Toledo, supremo organizador del Perú. Su vida, su obra (1515–1582). 1935
Lohman Villena, Guillermo and Maria Justina Sarabia Viejo, eds. Francisco de Toledo, Disposiciones, gubernativas para el virreinato del Perú, 1569–1574. 2 vols. 1986, 1989.
Zimmerman, Arthur Franklin. Francisco de Toledo, Fifth Viceroy of Peru, 1569–1581''. 1938.

References

External links

 Fairly long biography
Short biography
 Toledo, Francisco de, 

1515 births
1582 deaths
People from the Province of Toledo
Knights of the Order of Alcántara
Viceroys of Peru
Burials in the Province of Toledo